Thomas Luckmann (October 14, 1927 – May 10, 2016) was an American-Austrian sociologist of German and Slovene origin who taught mainly in Germany. Born in Jesenice, Kingdom of Yugoslavia, Luckmann studied philosophy and linguistics at the University of Vienna and the University of Innsbruck. He married Benita Petkevic in 1950. His contributions were central to studies in sociology of communication, sociology of knowledge, sociology of religion, and the philosophy of science. His best-known titles are the 1966 book, The Social Construction of Reality: A Treatise in the Sociology of Knowledge (co-authored with Peter L. Berger), The Invisible Religion (1967), and The Structures of the Life-World (1973) (co-authored with Alfred Schütz).

Biography

Early life and background 
Luckmann was born in Jesenice, which at the time was  part of the Kingdom of Yugoslavia. His father was an Austrian industrialist, while his mother was from a Slovene family from Ljubljana. On his mother's side, he was the cousin of the Slovene poet Božo Vodušek. As a child of two parents from two vastly different cultures, Luckmann grew up in a bilingual environment.  Luckmann grew up speaking both Slovene and German. He attended Slovene-language schools while in Jesenice until the year 1941, when the occupation of Slovenia during World War II forced him to transfer to a high school in Austria. 

He and his mother relocated to Vienna in 1943, after the death of his father and several other relatives during World War II. Living in Austria during this period automatically granted him German citizenship, and in 1944 he was drafted for the army, joining the Luftwaffe where he served as a Luftwaffenhelfer.  Luckmann was transferred to a military hosipital for minor injuries shortly before the end of the war. Luckmann was in the hospital in Bavaria when the United States liberated the region. After liberation, in 1945 Luckmann became a prisoner of war and escaped after three months. He then settled in Vienna.

Education 
Luckmann attended high school in Klagenfurt, after he and his family fled Italian occupation in Ljubljana in 1941. After escaping being a prisoner of war, Luckmann began studying philosophy and linguistics at the University of Vienna and Innsbruck. In 1950 he married Benita Petkevic, with whom he moved to the United States, where he studied at The New School in New York City. The couple had three daughters.

It was his time at The New College, did Luckmann begin to discern his career as a sociologist. He was introduced to the sociological discipline, was familiarized with Alfred Schütz’s work on sociological phenomenology, and met Peter Berger, where he would later go on to co-author The Social Construction of Reality. Together, he and his colleagues produced some of the most influential sociological works of the 20th century.

Luckmann never intended to become a sociologist. His initial academic interests resided in linguistics, history and philosophy. At The New School, Luckmann primarily studied philosophy and chose to study sociology as a second subject after admiring how his teachers specialized in these dual subjects. For example, Luckmann was introduced to the sociology of religion when his teacher at the time, Carl Meyer, asked him to do field work about churches in Germany after World War II. Captivated by his experience in Germany, Luckmann used his fieldwork to pursue a Ph.D in sociology.

He obtained his first academic position at Hobart College, in Geneva, New York, before returning to teach at The New School after the death of Alfred Schütz. Luckmann was eventually granted a professorship position at The University of Frankfurt in 1965. After publishing two books in 1963 and 1966, and several successful essays, Luckmann worked as a professor of Sociology at the University of Konstanz in Germany from 1970 to his retirement, and later professor emeritus. It is noted that his time in at Konstanz was marked as an intense period of interdisciplinary work, in which he wrote multiple essays concerning communication, linguistics, literature and history.

Marriage 

In 1950, Luckmann married Benita Petkevic, who was a Lativan-born social scientist who taught in Austria, Germany.

Death 
On May 10th 2016, Luckmann died of cancer at the age of 88 at his home in Austria.

Personal life

Family 
Luckmann and Benita Petkevic had three children together.

Work  
Early Work

Luckmann worked as a chauffeur and his, Benita, worked as a typist when they first moved to New York. During this time he continued studying sociology and philosophy at the New School for Research. It was there where he first met some of the great influences of his life, including Peter L. Berger.

Philosophy and Social Thought 
Luckmann was a follower of the phenomenologically oriented school of sociology, established by the Austrian-American scholar Alfred Schütz. He contributed to the foundation of phenomenological sociology, the sociology of religion in modern societies, and the sociology of knowledge and communication. The interdisciplinary nature of his work remains relevant in sociology and other disciplines today.

Social Constructionism 
In several of his works, he developed the theory of social constructionism, which argues that all knowledge, including the most basic common sense knowledge of everyday reality, is derived from and maintained by social interactions. Together with Peter L. Berger, he wrote the book The Social Construction of Reality in 1966. The book was an important part of the move in sociology, and particularly the sociology of religion, away from the view of religion and religious values as central to the social order, arguing that social order is socially constructed by individuals and/or groups of individuals. Since publication, the book has been translated into thirteen different languages and serves as a cornerstone in sociological literature.  Berger wrote on their experience writing the book saying "someone asked, Why did not The Social Construction of Reality immediately have a huge effect? The effect came much later, and my answer was that you cannot play chamber music at a rock concert. And compared to what was going on all around us in the social sciences, we were doing chamber music."

Sociology of Religion 
Following his field work in Germany and the completion of his dissertation, Luckmann was asked to complete several reviews on the surrounding sociological literature concerning religion. Disappointed by the positivistic, unauthentic views of a Church-backed sociology of religion, Luckmann was compelled to write The Invisible Religion in 1963. The book was then translated into English in 1967. Luckmann proposes that there are four derivative types of religion the first of those being a "is a universal and nonspecific elementary social form which is an objective total worldview providing social meaning for a society's existence."  The second, "the specific institutional social form of religion constituted by configurations of religious representations form- ing a sacred cosmos which is part of the worldview." The third, "a universal nonspecific form of individual religiosity which is an internalized subjective system of relevance reflecting the objectivated universal and nonspecific elementary social form of religion." Lastly, "a specific biographical form of religiosity in individual consciousness."  Drawing from Durkheim, Luckmann developed a functional perspective in his theoretical objectives. Luckmann's theory reiterate's Durkheim's notion that "the original symbol system whereby man emerged from the animal world was religious." Rather than reverting to popular explanations of secularization, Luckmann explained the emergence of a new kind of religion in the 20th century: private religion He explains the diffusion of world views and institutional de-specialization of religion led to a privatization, rather than a retreat, from religion. Though Luckmann initially received harsh criticisms, The Invisible Religion became a pivotal move within the sociology of religion in the 20th century, especially in conjunction with The Social Construction of Reality.

Sociology of Knowledge and Communication 
Luckmann’s contribution to the sociology of knowledge and communication is based on his careful analysis of the link between socio-cultural linguistic practices, and the construction of social reality. Based on his empirical research of conversational analysis, Luckmann explains his theory of “communicative genres” in which linguistic types, such as, gossip, proverbs, or jokes, all serve as forms of social knowledge, and act as tools for the formation of social structure. His ethnography of speaking, modeled a social interactional code that gave a dissimilar approach to sources of social constraint.

Social Action 
Luckmann continued this analysis of social action, and in 1982 he continued the work of Alfred Schütz, drawing on Schütz's notes and unfinished manuscripts to complete Structures of the Life-World, published (posthumously for Schütz) in 1982. Luckmann then built upon Schütz's analysis and published, Theory of Social Action in 1992.

Together with Richard Grathoff and Walter M. Sprondel, Luckmann founded the Social Science Archive Konstanz (also known as the Alfred Schütz Memorial Archives). What became the official archive of the German Sociological Association, Luckmann and his colleagues gathered research accounts of German social science.

In 1998 he was awarded an honorary doctorate from the Norwegian University of Science and Technology (NTNU).

In 2004 Luckmann became an honorary member of the Slovenian Sociological Association. The German Sociological Association awarded him a prize for his outstanding lifetime contribution to sociology at its 2002 Congress, and Luckmann became an honorary member in 2016.

The original Thomas Luckmann Papers are deposited in the Social Science Archive Konstanz.

Legacy 
Luckmann's ideas have had a huge impact on the world and intellectual thought. 

50th Anniversary Social Construction Thomas Luckmann.

Essential bibliography 

The Social Construction of Reality (1966, with Peter L. Berger)
The Invisible Religion (1967)
The Sociology of Language (1975)Structures of the Life-World (1982, with Alfred Schütz)Life-World and Social Realities (1983)The Sociology of Language (1975)Theory of Social Action (1992)

 See also 
Alfred Schütz 
Peter L. Berger 
Jože Pučnik

References

 Further reading 
Davie, Grace, "Luckmann, Thomas" in Encyclopedia of Religion and Society edited by, William H. Swatos, Jr. 1998. http://hirr.hartsem.edu/ency/luckmann.htm 

Berger, Peter and Luckmann, Thomas. The Social Construction of Reality, 1967. Penguin Books, London. http://perflensburg.se/Berger%20social-construction-of-reality.pdf

Frane Adam, "Tomaž Luckmann" in Thomas Luckmann, Družba, komunikacija, smisel, transcendenca (Ljubljana: Študentska založba, 2007)
Patricija Maličev, "Thomas Luckmann. Človek s posebnostmi" in Delo, Sobotna priloga'' (April 12, 2008), 25-27
Bernt Schnettler, "Thomas Luckmann", UVK, Konstanz 2007 (in German, 158 pages)
Marcin K. Zwierżdżynski, "Where is Religion? The Five Dichotomies of Thomas Luckmann", Nomos, Cracow 2009 (in Polish, 288 pages, with summary in English)

External links

Encyclopedia of Religion and Society: Thomas Luckmann
Schutz, Alfred: Thomas Luckmann, Internet Encyclopedia of Philosophy
Original Thomas Luckmann Papers - Social Science Archive Konstanz
Interview with Thomas Luckmann 
Obituary: Thomas Luckmann

1927 births
2016 deaths
German sociologists
Sociologists of religion
University of Vienna alumni
Academic staff of the University of Konstanz
Members of the Slovenian Academy of Sciences and Arts
People from Jesenice, Jesenice
German people of Slovenian descent
German male writers
Social constructionism
Yugoslav emigrants to the United States
Luftwaffenhelfer
German prisoners of war in World War II
German escapees